Johann Louw (born 12 April 1979) is a South African cricketer.

Louw was born in Cape Town, Cape Province. He is a right-arm medium-fast bowler who has represented Griqualand West, Eastern Province, Northamptonshire, Dolphins, Eagles and Middlesex. Louw is a bowling all-rounder and is a noted one-day cricketer with the ability to finish an innings with bat and ball.

Louw made his international debut in a Twenty20 International against Kenya in Kimberley on 2 November 2008.

External links

1979 births
Living people
South African cricketers
South Africa One Day International cricketers
South Africa Twenty20 International cricketers
Dolphins cricketers
Eastern Province cricketers
Knights cricketers
Griqualand West cricketers
Middlesex cricketers
Northamptonshire cricketers
Cricketers from Cape Town
Afrikaner people
South African people of Dutch descent
Cape Cobras cricketers
Boland cricketers
South African cricket coaches